Ko Min-jung (Korean: 고민정; born August 23, 1979) is a former KBS announcer previously served as the presidential spokesperson at the Blue House under President Moon Jae-in and currently serving as a National Assembly member from Seoul.

In 2004 she passed the exam and joined Announcers' Bureau of Programming Department of KBS. From 2005 to 2017 she hosted various - mostly informative, family-targeted - tv shows and two radio programmes.

After resigning from the well-paid job at a national broadcaster in 2017, she worked with Moon as his spokesperson during his campaign for Democratic Party primary and 2017 presidential elections. After his inauguration as the President, she continued her career with Moon as his first vice presidential spokesperson. In April 2019 she was promoted to presidential spokesperson after her predecessor resigned. In January 2020 she resigned the post for upcoming 2020 general election.

In the 2020 general election, Ko defeated the former Seoul mayor and a potential presidential candidate for the opposition party, Oh Se-hoon. In 2021 she joined - as a spokesperson - the campaign of Park Young-sun, her party's candidate for Seoul mayor in 2021 South Korean by-elections where Oh is nominated by the main opposition party.

She holds Bachelor and Master's in Chinese language and literature from Kyung Hee University and Qingdao University respectively.

Electoral history

Personal life 
She is married to Cho Ki-young, a poet whom she met at Kyunghee University campus.

References 

1979 births
Qingdao University alumni
Kyung Hee University alumni
Living people
People from Seoul
Members of the National Assembly (South Korea)
Minjoo Party of Korea politicians
21st-century South Korean women politicians
21st-century South Korean politicians
South Korean government officials
South Korean broadcasters
Female members of the National Assembly (South Korea)